Lieutenant General Cyril Albert Clowes,  (11 March 1892 – 19 May 1968) was an Australian soldier. He won the first land victory against the Japanese in the Second World War, at the Battle of Milne Bay, New Guinea. Like many other senior officers involved in the Papuan campaign, he was then transferred to a less important posting by General Sir Thomas Blamey.

Early life and First World War
Clowes was born at Warwick in Queensland, and entered the Royal Military College, Duntroon in 1911. In August 1914 he graduated and was appointed lieutenant in the Australian Imperial Force (AIF) with a commission in the Permanent Military Force. Posted to the 1st Field Artillery Brigade, he landed at Gallipoli on 25 April 1915, serving as a forward observation officer and directing naval gunfire against Turkish positions. He was wounded at Gallipoli. After he recuperated Clowes was promoted to captain in the 2nd Divisional Artillery in Egypt during January 1916.

On the Western Front during 1916, Clowes served as the 2nd Division's Trench Mortar Officer and was awarded the Military Cross. He received a promotion to major in January 1917 and the following year was awarded the Distinguished Service Order for his work at Villers-Bretonneux. He returned to Australia in April 1919, and left the AIF in late June.

Inter war years
In 1920 Clowes took up a post as instructor at Duntroon, and remained there until 1925. That year he married Eva Magennis, and moved to Brisbane. There Clowes undertook staff, training, and command duties until 1930. He filled similar positions in Sydney and Darwin until, in 1936, he was promoted to lieutenant colonel. He went to England and completed a gunnery staff course, before returning to Australia as the Chief Instructor at Sydney's School of Artillery. In August 1939 he was given command of Australia's 6th Military District, receiving a promotion to colonel.

Second World War
When the Second World War began, Clowes was made a temporary brigadier in the AIF, and in April 1940 was appointed commander of the Royal Australian Artillery, I Corps. Clowes performed very well under pressure in directing the fighting withdrawal at Pinios Gorge, Greece, in April 1941. The Germans were attempting to drive a wedge between Greek units and the allied force sent to their aid. Clowes was successful in holding the gorge against a strong German tank attack, until the situation on other parts of the front stabilised.

Although Greece fell and the campaign was a failure, Clowes' tactics minimised casualties in the withdrawal of the allied force. This battle saw the beginning of a problem that would dog Clowes' career – disputes between his superior General Sir Thomas Blamey, and Blamey's Chief of Staff, Colonel Sydney Rowell, a personal friend of Clowes. Clowes returned to Australia in January 1942, was promoted to temporary Major General, and given command of the 1st Division.

Milne Force

In May 1942 General Douglas MacArthur, Allied Commander in Chief of the South West Pacific Area (C in C SWPA), ordered the construction of an airfield at Milne Bay, at the eastern tip of New Guinea. His intention was to use this and other new airfields to attempt the reconquest of Rabaul, taken by the Japanese early in the war. However the airfield would also be a prize for the Japanese to attack. Once taken it could be a base for bombing sorties over the cities of south eastern Australia. MacArthur requested Thomas Blamey send troops to secure the construction site.

Initially a militia brigade was dispatched. As building progressed this was progressively reinforced with regular troops. Once buildup was complete, the garrison assumed the name Milne Force, and Clowes, now promoted to Major General, was given command. He reached Milne Bay and assumed command of the Australian troops there just four days before the Japanese began landing, beginning the Battle of Milne Bay.

Battle of Milne Bay

The Japanese made their initial landing on 25 August 1942 under Commander Yoshihide Hayashi.
By dawn of 26 August, the Japanese had reached KB Mission.  A counterattack by the 61st Militia Battalion drove the Japanese from KB Mission, however after six hours of intense fighting, the militia withdrew to the Gama River. Clowes ordered the Australian 2/10th Infantry Battalion to the Gama River, where they attacked. The Japanese troops and the supporting tanks inflicted severe casualties on the 2/10th, which was forced to retreat to north of No. 3 Strip (under construction), on 27 August. The 25th Battalion held the Japanese back and a two-day lull followed.

On 29 August 768 Japanese marine reinforcements were landed with Commander Minoru Yano, who took over from Hayashi.  On 31 August at 3:00am, three banzai charges were repelled at No. 3 Strip with withering machine gun and mortar fire from Milne Force. The Australians launched a counter offensive at 9:00am on 31 August, and pushed the Japanese along the north coast of Milne Bay. By 4 September Japanese resistance was suicidal in intensity.

On 5 September, the Japanese high command ordered a withdrawal. On 6 September the offensive reached the main camp of the Japanese landing force. That night most Japanese survivors were evacuated. Some, trying to reach the Japanese beachhead at Buna through the mountains, were intercepted and routed.

Difficulties at Milne Bay

Milne Bay is a very high rainfall area, and the all-pervading mud made transport a constant problem for Clowes. He had no barges or four-wheel drive vehicles for moving troops around. Milne Force included the highly trained 18th Infantry Brigade of the Australian 7th Division, but also the inexperienced and poorly-equipped 7th Militia Brigade. Of the total force of 8,824, only about 4,500 were infantry.

Several times during the battle, urgent signals arrived from MacArthur and Blamey, warning of imminent Japanese reinforcements, and urging him to pursue and exterminate the enemy landing force immediately. However, Clowes' original orders confirmed that his priority was holding the completed airstrip at Gili Gili. He maintained a defensive perimeter there which was never penetrated, even while taking the fight to the enemy at some distance from this base. MacArthur was responding to inaccurate intelligence. Clowes had no choice but to heed the new intelligence, and try to relocate his forces to deal with threats that in fact did not materialise.

At one point Rowell received orders from Blamey that the "landed force must be attacked with greatest vigor and destroyed as soon as possible". Rowell refused to relay this to Clowes, and instead wrote "Confident you have the situation well in hand and will administer stern punishment".

Relieved of command
MacArthur and Thomas Blamey determined that rather than being commended and rewarded for the victory, Clowes should be relieved of his command and sidelined for the duration of the war, for showing insufficient "vigour". Blamey wrote to Sydney Rowell, now Clowes' superior officer in Port Moresby:

Blamey subsequently sacked Rowell and shortly after, Rowell's friend Clowes. Clowes returned to Australia in 1943 and held various postings until the end of the war.

Later life
Clowes retired from the Army with the rank of lieutenant general in June 1949. His chief staff officer at Milne Bay, Colonel Fred Chilton, said he was

He was known as "Silent" Cyril Clowes. In A Bastard of a Place: The Australians in Papua, Australian historian Peter Brune explained why;

Clowes died on 19 May 1968 at Repatriation General Hospital, Heidelberg, Melbourne.

Notes

References

External links

 Who's who in Australian Military History – Australian War Memorial

|-

1892 births
1968 deaths
Military personnel from Queensland
Australian Commanders of the Order of the British Empire
Australian Companions of the Distinguished Service Order
Australian generals
Australian military personnel of World War I
Australian Army personnel of World War II
Australian recipients of the Military Cross
People educated at Toowoomba Grammar School
People from Warwick, Queensland
Royal Military College, Duntroon graduates